Alessandro Carmelo Ruffinoni is the retired bishop of Caxias do Sul and a Scalabrinian priest.

Biography 

Born in Piazza Brembana in 1943, fourth of five children, he completed his studies between Rezzato and Cermenate. He entered the Scalabrinian Congregation in 1961, to be ordained priest on 8 March 1970. He left Italy for Brazil as a missionary in following November.

From 1988 to 1998 he was director of the Centro Missionero P. Luigi Valtulini in Ciudad del Este, Paraguay; and from 1999 to 2004 he was provincial superior in Brazil.

Elected titular bishop of Furnos Maior in 2006, he was ordained as auxiliary bishop of Porto Alegre on 17 March 2006, and moved to Caxias do Sul as coadjutor bishop on 16 June 2010.

He succeeded the see on 6 July 2011, and remained in office until 26 June 2019 when Pope Francis accepted his resignation.

Fotogallery

Honours and awards

References

External links
Profile of Mons. Ruffinoni www.catholic-hierarchy.org
Page of diocese of Caxias do Sul

1943 births
Italian Roman Catholic missionaries
Living people
21st-century Roman Catholic bishops in Brazil
Clergy from the Province of Bergamo
Italian expatriates in Brazil
Roman Catholic bishops of Porto Alegre
Roman Catholic bishops of Caxias do Sul